"Strong Weakness" is a song written by David Bellamy, and recorded by American country music duo The Bellamy Brothers.  It was released in September 1983 as the fourth single and title track from the album Strong Weakness.  The song reached number 15 on the Billboard Hot Country Singles & Tracks chart.

Chart performance

References

1983 singles
1982 songs
The Bellamy Brothers songs
Song recordings produced by Jimmy Bowen
Warner Records singles
Curb Records singles
Songs written by David Bellamy (singer)